{{DISPLAYTITLE:C18H12O4}}
The molecular formula C18H12O4 (molar mass: 292.28 g/mol, exact mass: 292.0736 u) may refer to:

 Karanjin
 Polyporic acid

Molecular formulas